The 2014 UEFA Women's Under-17 Championship was the seventh edition of the UEFA Women's Under-17 Championship. England hosted the final tournament from 26 November to 8 December 2013, taking it for the first time outside of Nyon, Switzerland. It was the first edition to feature eight finalist teams, and served as the qualifier for the 2014 FIFA U-17 Women's World Cup, to be held in March–April 2014.

Portugal ensured their first presence in the competition's final tournament, after concluding the qualification as the best runner-up. They will join France, Germany and Spain, together with fellow debutants Austria, Italy and Scotland. Poland were the defending champions, having defeating Sweden 1–0 in the previous season's final, but were unable to defend their title after failing qualification for this edition's final tournament.

Qualification

Qualification for the final tournament consisted of two rounds. The first round was held between 2 July and 11 August 2013, and the second round between 20 September and 20 October 2013. As hosts, England qualified automatically for the final tournament, while France, Germany and Spain received a bye to the second round due to their coefficient ranking. Forty teams entered the draw for the first round, held on 20 November 2012, where they were distributed in ten groups of four. Each group was contested as a mini-tournament hosted in the country of one of the group's teams. The group winners, runners-up and the best third-placed team qualified for the second round, where the 24 teams were drawn in six groups of four. The group winners and the best runners-up qualified for the final tournament.

Qualified teams
The following eight teams qualified for the final tournament:

Match officials
UEFA named six referees and eight assistant referees to officiate matches at the final tournament. Additionally, two referees from the host nation were chosen as fourth officials.

Referees
  Irina Turovskaya (Belarus)
  Vesna Budimir (Croatia)
  Eleni Lampadariou (Finland)
  Ana Minić (Serbia)
  Sara Persson (Sweden)
  Zuzana Štrpková (Slovakia)

Assistant referees
  Ekatinera Marinova (Bulgaria)
  Mathilde Abildgaard (Denmark)
  Katalin Török (Hungary)
  Yelena Alistratova (Kazakhstan)
  Anna Dąbrowska (Poland)
  Susanne Küng (Switzerland)
  Yana Saschyna (Ukraine)

Fourth officials
  Virginie Derouaux (Belgium)
  Tania Fernandes Morais (Luxembourg)

Group stage

The draw was held on 24 October 2013 at Burton-upon-Trent.

The top two teams of each group advance to the semi-finals.

Tie-breaking
If two or more teams were equal on points on completion of the group matches, the following tie-breaking criteria were applied:
 Higher number of points obtained in the matches played between the teams in question;
 Superior goal difference resulting from the matches played between the teams in question;
 Higher number of goals scored in the matches played between the teams in question;
If, after having applied criteria 1 to 3, teams still have an equal ranking, criteria 1 to 3 are reapplied exclusively to the matches between the teams in question to determine their final rankings. If this procedure does not lead to a decision, criteria 4 to 7 apply.

If only two teams are tied (according to criteria 1–7) after having met in the last match of the group stage, their ranking is determined by a penalty shoot-out.

All times are in Greenwich Mean Time (UTC±00:00).

Group A

Group B

Knockout stage
In the knockout stage, penalty shoot-out is used to decide the winner if necessary (no extra time is played).

Bracket

Semifinals

Third place match

Final

Goalscorers
4 goals
 Jasmin Sehan
 Andrea Falcón

2 goals

 Lucy Porter
 Ricarda Walkling
 Aitana Bonmati
 Patricia Guijarro

1 goal

 Barbara Dunst
 Nina Wasserbauer
 Evie Clarke
 Alice Hassall
 Chloe Kelly
 Ashleigh Plumptre
 Atlanta Primus
 Mollie Rouse
 Julie Marichaud
 Nina Ehegötz
 Saskia Meier
 Michaela Specht
 Federica Cavicchia
 Manuela Giugliano
 Gloria Marinelli
 Leandra Pereira
 Kirsty Howat
 Alyshia Walker
 Mireya García Boa
 Pilar Garrote

References

External links
UEFA.com

 
2014
Women's Under-17 Championship
2014
2014 in women's association football
2013–14 in English women's football
2013–14 in German women's football
2013–14 in Spanish women's football
2013–14 in Italian women's football
2013 in Scottish women's football
2013–14 in French women's football
2013–14 in Portuguese women's football
2013–14 in Austrian football
2014 in youth sport
December 2013 sports events in the United Kingdom
2014 in youth association football